Quranic inerrancy is a doctrine central to the Muslim faith that the Quran is the infallible and inerrant word of God as  revealed to Muhammad by the archangel Gabriel in the 7th century CE.

Modernist approach 

Influenced by Jamal al-Din al-Afghani's modernist interpretations, Muhammad Abduh, Grand Mufti of Egypt, revisited then contemporary Islamic thought with his ijtihad after 1899. In the Tafsir al-Manar, published by Rashid Rida from notes taken on Abduh's lectures, he expressed that wherever the Quran seemed contradictory and irrational to logic and science must be understood as reflecting the Arab vision of the world, as  written with available seventh century intellectual level of Arabs; all verses referring to superstitions like witchcraft and the evil eye be explained as expressions of then Arab beliefs; and miraculous events and deeds in Quran be rationally explained just as metaphors or allegories.

See also 

 Apostasy in Islam
 Bibliolatry
 Biblical inerrancy
 Cultural Muslim
 Criticism of Islam 
 Criticism of Islamism 
 Early Quranic manuscripts 
 Islamic Modernism
 Qur'anic literalism

References 

Islamic theology
Islamic belief and doctrine
Inerrancy